Andrea Harsági (born 22 March 1971) is a Hungarian badminton player. She competed in women's singles at the 1992 Summer Olympics in Barcelona.

References

External links

1971 births
Living people
Hungarian female badminton players
Olympic badminton players of Hungary
Badminton players at the 1992 Summer Olympics
People from Nyíregyháza
Sportspeople from Szabolcs-Szatmár-Bereg County